Sir Erik Olof Ohlson, 1st Baronet (19 July 1873 – 20 March 1934) was a Swedish-born British shipping magnate and coal and timber merchant.

Ohlson was a son of a farmer in the village of Oppeby in Fellingsbro parish, Sweden. He spent ten years in the coal importing business in Sweden. In 1902, he emigrated to Hull, England, and established the firm of Ohlson & Co, shipowners and brokers, coal exporters, and timber importers.

He was knighted in 1915 and created a baronet, of Scarborough, in the 1920 New Year Honours for his efforts to bring Sweden into the British camp during the First World War.

Ohlson was succeeded in the baronetcy by his elder son, Sir Eric James Ohlson (1911–1983).

Footnotes

References
Obituary, The Times, 21 March 1934
Kidd, Charles, Williamson, David (editors). Debrett's Peerage and Baronetage (1990 edition). New York: St Martin's Press, 1990, 

1934 deaths
Swedish businesspeople
British businesspeople in shipping
Baronets in the Baronetage of the United Kingdom
Knights Bachelor
Swedish emigrants to the United Kingdom
1873 births